Luciana Della Casa (born 24 February 1971) is a former professional tennis player from Brazil.

She has career-high WTA rankings of 383 in singles, achieved on 26 November 1990, and 224 in doubles, reached on 17 July 1989.

She made her WTA Tour main-draw debut at the 1990 Brasil Tennis Cup.

ITF finals

Doubles: 3 (0–3)

References

External links 
 

1971 births
Brazilian female tennis players
Living people